Chess in the 27th Southeast Asian Games took place at Zabuthiri Hotel in Naypyidaw, Myanmar between December 12–21.

Medal summary

Men

Women

Mixed doubles

Medal table

References

2013 Southeast Asian Games events
Southeast Asian Games
2013